Abhishek Verma (born 26 June 1989) is an Indian archer. At the 2014 Asian Games at Incheon, South Korea, he won the gold medal in the men's compound archery team event along with Rajat Chauhan and Sandeep Kumar, and the silver medal in the men's individual compound event.
On 15 August 2015, he won a gold medal in the compound men's individual section at the Archery World Cup Stage 3 in Wroclaw, Poland. On 25 October 2015, he won the silver medal in the compound men's individual section at the Archery World Cup Final in Mexico city.

The Indian men's compound team, that was composed of Abhishek Verma, Chinna Raju Srither and Amanjeet Singh, won bronze on the penultimate day of the archery World Cup stage one championship in Shanghai, after defeating Colombia for 226-221.

Abhishek Verma works as an income tax inspector in the Income Tax Department. He backs his position by holding the top rank in selection trails.

On 17 November 2021, he won the bronze medal in the men's compound archery team event along with Rishabh Yadav and Aman Saini at the 22nd Asian Archery Championship in Dhaka, Bangladesh.

In Year 2022, teaming with Jyothi Surekha Vennam, he won gold medal in compound mixed team archery event in Archery World Cup held at Paris,France.

Asian Games 
Abhishek Verma won gold and silver medals at the 2014 Asian Games. In Asian Games 2018 he won a team silver medal with Rajat Chauhan and Aman Saini.

Awards
 Arjuna Award (2014)

References

External links
Profile at incheon2014.kr
Profile at worldarchery.org

Living people
1989 births
Indian male archers
Place of birth missing (living people)
Asian Games medalists in archery
Archers at the 2014 Asian Games
Archers at the 2018 Asian Games
Recipients of the Arjuna Award
Punjabi people
Asian Games gold medalists for India
Asian Games silver medalists for India
Medalists at the 2014 Asian Games
Sportspeople from Delhi
Medalists at the 2018 Asian Games
World Archery Championships medalists
Competitors at the 2017 World Games
Competitors at the 2022 World Games
World Games bronze medalists
World Games medalists in archery
20th-century Indian people
21st-century Indian people